The 1936 Montana Grizzlies football team represented the University of Montana in the 1936 college football season as a member of the Pacific Coast Conference (PCC). The Grizzlies were led by second-year head coach Doug Fessenden, played their home games at Dornblaser Field and finished the season with a record of six wins and three losses (6–3, 1–3 PCC).

Schedule

References

Montana
Montana Grizzlies football seasons
Montana Grizzlies football